Duidaea is a genus of Venezuelan flowering plants in the family Asteraceae.

The Duidaea is deried from to Cerro Duida (or Mount Duida) in Venezuela.

 Species
 Duidaea marahuacensis Steyerm. - Venezuela
 Duidaea pinifolia S.F.Blake - Venezuela
 Duidaea rubriceps S.F.Blake - Venezuela
 Duidaea tatei S.F.Blake - Venezuela

References

Flora of Venezuela
Asteraceae genera
Stifftioideae